The Premio Gabriela Mistral (Premio Interamericano de Cultura "Gabriela Mistral" or Gabriela Mistral Inter-American Prize for Culture) was an award made by the Organization of American States. It was created in 1979 in memory of the Nobel laureate Gabriela Mistral.

No awards have been made since 2000.

Awardees
The list of awardees includes:
  Antonio Cisneros (2000) Artes Literarias
  Marisol Escobar (1997) Artes Plásticas
  Martin Carter (1996) Artes Literarias
  José Antonio Abreu Artes Musicales
  Olga Orozco (1994) Artes Literarias
  Gregorio Weimberg Filosofía
  Francisco Miró Quesada Cantuarias Filosofía
  Francisco Brennand (1993) Artes Plásticas
  Blas Galindo (1992) Artes Musicales
  Pablo Antonio Cuadra (1991) Artes Literarias
  Museo del Barro de Paraguay directed by Carlos Colombino (1990) Artes Plásticas
  Juan Orrego Salas (1988) Artes Musicales
  Leopoldo Zea (1987) Artes Literarias
  Alfredo Volpi (1986) Artes Plásticas
  Robert Stevenson (1985) Artes Musicales
  Francisco Curt Lange Artes Musicales 
  Ernesto Sábato (1984) Artes Literarias

External links
 OAS announcement, 2000 
 En Mérida entregarán el Premio Interamericano "Gabriela Mistral" - prize hosted by the city of Mérida, Yucatán, in 2000

Organization of American States